DeBolt Aerodrome  is located  north of Debolt, Alberta, Canada.

References

External links
Page about this airport on COPA's Places to Fly airport directory

Registered aerodromes in Alberta
Municipal District of Greenview No. 16